Jeremy Jones (born April 30, 1971, in Baytown, Texas) is a professional pool player. He was the 1998 US Open One Pocket champion, the 2003 US Open 9 Ball champion, and has represented Team USA in the Mosconi Cup on seven occasions. Jones was the runner-up at the 1999 WPA World Nine-ball Championship losing 13–8 to Nick Varner in the final.

Personal life
Jones was first introduced to the pool tables at the age of 17, while he was working as a pizza delivery man in Houston, Texas. He then went on to quit his delivery job and got a job at a games room, in order to be able to play pool for free.

After playing pool with friends for many years, Jones began competing in amateur tournaments around the United States.

In 1997, Jones won the BCA National 8-Ball Masters, finishing as runner-up the previous year. In 2008 he won the BCA 9-Ball Open.

Professional career

In 1994, he decided to go professional and toured all but 2 of the 50 states in the United States.  In 1998, he won the U.S. Open One-Pocket Championship, and in 2003, he won the U.S. Open 9-Ball Championship.

In January 2018, Jeremy Jones was inducted into the One Pocket Hall of Fame for his Outstanding Contribution to the Legacy of One Pocket.

Jones was a commentator at the Matchroom Multi Sport 2021 US Open in Atlantic City, New Jersey.  He also competed in the event. Jones has been captain of Team USA for the Mosconi Cup in 2020 and 2021.  He was vice captain for Team USA at the Mosconi Cup in 2019.

Career titles and achievements
 1997 BCA National 8-Ball Masters
 1998 U.S. Open One-Pocket Championship
 1999 Camel Pro Billiards 9-Ball Open
 1999 Mosconi Cup
 2000 Mosconi Cup
 2001 Mosconi Cup
 2001 Lexington Open
 2003 U.S. Open 9-Ball Championship
 2003 Mosconi Cup
 2003 Texas Open
 2005 Mosconi Cup
 2007 Houston Open
 2008 BCA Open Nine-ball Championship
 2012 Space City Open One Pocket
 2018 One Pocket Hall of Fame

References

External links
History of the Mosconi Cup

1971 births
American pool players
Living people
People from Baytown, Texas
Sportspeople from Harris County, Texas